Haribhanga is a village situated in Salop Union of Ullahpara Upazila, Bangladesh. Nearby places are Mohonpur, Sheikhpara, Kansona, Salop, Gobindapur, Soguna, Gopalpur, Konabari, Kalipur, and Soratoil.

References

Populated places in Rajshahi Division
Villages in Sirajganj District
Villages in Rajshahi Division